"Odiseja" (Serbo-Croatian for Odyssey) is a schlager song recorded by Serbian-Yugoslavian singer Leo Martin in 1973. The song was first performed by Dalibor Brun at the 1973 , where it was ranked 7th in the finals. Martin released "Odiseja" as a 7" single and it was later included in his 1974 album also titled Odiseja. It became Martin's signature song, and a huge hit in Yugoslavia. The single sold 100,000 copies in the first week.

References

1973 songs
1973 singles
Serbian pop songs